This is a round-up of the 2000 Sligo Senior Football Championship. This Championship, after a number of years of being dominated by Eastern Harps and Tourlestrane, provided a novel final pairing, as Bunninadden (last champions in 1891) and Coolera/Strandhiill (last champions in 1907) contested the final, Coolera having dispatched both of the previous champions en route. The destination of the title went down to the last minute, as a dramatic injury-time goal gave Bunninadden their first title for 109 years, leaving Coolera devastated, after leading for much of the game.

James Kearins was the winning manager and was later appointed manager of the Sligo county team in 2003.

Group stages

The Championship was contested by 12 teams, divided into four groups. The top two sides in each group advanced to the quarter-finals.

Group A

Group B

Group C

Group D

Quarterfinals

Semifinals

Last eight

Sligo Senior Football Championship Final

References

 Sligo Champion (July–October 2000)
 Sligo Weekender (July–October 2000)

Sligo Senior Football Championship
Sligo